Super Hits is a greatest hits album from Miles Davis. Released in 2001, it reached #22 on Billboards Jazz Albums chart.

Track listing
"So What" (Davis) – 9:22 (from Kind of Blue)
"Someday My Prince Will Come" (Frank Churchill and Larry Morey) – 9:02 (from Someday My Prince Will Come)
"Time After Time" (Cyndi Lauper and Rob Hyman) – 3:39 (from You're Under Arrest)
"Summertime" (George Gershwin, Ira Gershwin, and DuBose Heyward) – 3:17 (from Porgy and Bess)
"Eighty-One" (Ron Carter and Davis) – 6:21 (from E.S.P.)
"Bye Bye Blackbird" (Ray Henderson) – 7:54 (from 'Round About Midnight)
"New Rhumba" (Ahmad Jamal) – 4:37 (from Miles Ahead)
"Human Nature" (Steve Porcaro and John Bettis) – 4:31 (from You're Under Arrest)

Personnel
"So What"
Cannonball Adderley – alto saxophone
Paul Chambers – double bass
Jimmy Cobb – drum kit
John Coltrane – tenor saxophone
Miles Davis – trumpet, band leader
Bill Evans – piano

"Someday My Prince Will Come"
Paul Chambers – double bass
Jimmy Cobb – drum kit
John Coltrane – tenor saxophone
Miles Davis – trumpet, band leader
Wynton Kelly – piano
Hank Mobley – tenor saxophone

"Time After Time"
Bob Berg – soprano saxophone
Miles Davis – trumpet
Al Foster – drums
Robert Irving III – synthesizer
Darryl Jones – bass
John McLaughlin – guitar
John Scofield – guitar

"Summertime"
Cannonball Adderley – alto saxophone
Danny Bank – alto flute, bass clarinet
Bill Barber – tuba
Phil Bodner – flute, alto flute, clarinet
Joe Bennett – trombone
Paul Chambers – bass
Jimmy Cleveland – trombone
Jimmy Cobb – drum kit
Johnny Coles – trumpet
Miles Davis – trumpet, flugelhorn
Gil Evans – arrangement and conducting
Bernie Glow – trumpet
Dick Hixon – trombone
Louis Mucci – trumpet
Romeo Penque – flute, alto flute, clarinet
Frank Rehak – trombone
Jerome Richardson – flute, alto flute, clarinet
Ernie Royal – trumpet
Willie Ruff – horn
Gunther Schuller – horn
Julius Watkins – horn

"Eighty-One"
Ron Carter – double bass
Miles Davis – trumpet
Herbie Hancock – piano
Wayne Shorter – tenor saxophone
Tony Williams – drum kit

"Bye Bye Blackbird"
Paul Chambers – bass
John Coltrane – tenor saxophone
Miles Davis – trumpet
Red Garland – piano
Philly Joe Jones – drum kit

"New Rhumba"
Danny Bank – bass clarinet
Bill Barber – tuba
Joe Bennett – trombone
John Carisi – trumpet
Paul Chambers – bass
Jimmy Cleveland – trombone
Sid Cooper – flute, clarinet
Miles Davis – flugelhorn
Bernie Glow – trumpet
Taft Jordan – trumpet
Lee Konitz – alto saxophone
Tom Mitchell – bass trombone
Tony Miranda – horn
Louis Mucci – trumpet
Romeo Penque – flute, clarinet
Frank Rehak – trombone
Ernie Royal – trumpet
Willie Ruff – horn
Art Taylor – drum kit

"Human Nature"
Bob Berg – soprano sax
Miles Davis – trumpet
Al Foster – drums
Robert Irving III – synthesizer
Darryl Jones – bass
John McLaughlin – guitar
John Scofield – guitar

Release history

References

External links

2001 greatest hits albums
Albums produced by Irving Townsend
Albums produced by Teo Macero
Legacy Recordings compilation albums
Miles Davis compilation albums
Instrumental compilation albums